Whitely King, was a union organizer in Australia in the late 19th century. 

He is featured in the folk song "The Shearer and the Rouseabout" by Joe Watson and the poem "Saint Peter" by Henry Lawson (later adapted into a folk song by Peter Duggan).

A certain kind of homemade weapon was colloquially known as a Whitely King as well, named for the man.

References
Profile of Joe Watson lyrics; includes definition of homemade weapon
"The Shooting of William (Billy) McLean" by Dennis O’Keeffe; describes King's role in a Pastoralist union action

Australian trade unionists
Year of death missing
Year of birth missing